Maikel Scheffers and Ronald Vink defeated Stéphane Houdet and Michaël Jérémiasz in the final, 7–5, 6–2 to win the gentlemen's doubles wheelchair tennis title at the 2011 Wimbledon Championships. With the win, Scheffers completed the career Grand Slam.

Robin Ammerlaan and Stefan Olsson were the defending champions, but were defeated by Scheffers and Vink in the semifinals.

Seeds

  Maikel Scheffers /  Ronald Vink (champions)
  Tom Egberink /  Shingo Kunieda (semifinals, fourth place)

Draw

Finals

External links
Draw

Men's Wheelchair Doubles
Wimbledon Championship by year – Wheelchair men's doubles